Laura Marie Marano (born November 29, 1995) is an American actress and singer.  She is known for her role in the Disney Channel series Austin & Ally as Ally Dawson. Marano was one of the five original classmates in Are You Smarter than a 5th Grader?. She starred in Without a Trace for three seasons and Back to You. Marano starred in the indie film A Sort of Homecoming, the Disney Channel Original Movie Bad Hair Day, and the Netflix original movie The Perfect Date.

In 2015, she signed with Big Machine Records and released her debut single "Boombox" on March 11, 2016, and "La La" later that year. On October 5, 2018, Laura Marano released the single "Me" as an independent artist.

Early life 
Marano was born in Los Angeles, California. She is the younger daughter of college professor Damiano Marano and former actress Ellen Marano, who owns the Agoura Children's Theatre. Her father is of Italian descent. Marano was first introduced to acting at her mother's theatre. At age five, Marano began expressing interest in acting professionally to her parents along with her older sister Vanessa, who is also an actress. Marano began learning to play the piano, at age nine. 

Marano attended traditional school while she worked, even when she booked a full-time job on Austin & Ally, instead of doing school on set. "I go to an actual high school and my friends and everybody there have been so supportive," said Marano. "It's nice when I'm not working to go to that school and be surrounded by really supportive friends." In 2015 Marano enrolled at the University of Southern California majoring in Philosophy, Politics and Law.

Career

2003–2010: Without a Trace and Back to You 
Marano's first acting role was when she was five years old. Since then, she worked for multiple productions at the Stage Door Theater. She has appeared in numerous commercials and had small roles on Ghost Whisperer, Medical Investigation, Huff and Joan of Arcadia. Her bigger roles in television have been in Without a Trace and other shows. She played the child role of Keira Knightley's character in the film The Jacket and had a small flashback role in the film Superbad. She was a regular cast member on the Fox game show, Are You Smarter than a 5th Grader? and played the role of Gracie Carr on FOX's sitcom Back to You. Marano has since appeared in several episodes of The Sarah Silverman Program. Initially she was cast in the pilot episode, "Batteries", as the child version of Sarah Silverman, and the writers liked her so much they brought her back for a larger role as a girl Sarah coaches to win a beauty pageant ("Not Without My Daughter"). On the DVD commentary track, co-star Brian Posehn notes that Marano knew everyone else's lines better than they did. She also appeared in Dexter as the child version of Debra Morgan, and in Heroes as Alice Shaw, the child version of Diana Scarwid's character.

2011–2016: Austin & Ally and radio 
In 2011, Marano began playing Ally Dawson on the Disney Channel series Austin & Ally. In 2013, Marano recorded four solo songs and one duet with Ross Lynch for the soundtrack album Austin & Ally: Turn It Up. "Me and You" debuted within the U.S. Billboard Kid Digital Songs chart at number thirteen before rising to the sixth spot, spending eleven weeks on the chart. "Redial" debuted at number nineteen before peaking at number eighteen, spending four weeks on the chart. Also in 2013, Marano recorded a duet with her Austin & Ally co-star Ross Lynch entitled "I Love Christmas" for Disney Channel's third holiday compilation album, Holidays Unwrapped. On November 25, 2013, the song was released as a promotional single. On December 14, "I Love Christmas" debuted within the U.S. Billboard Holiday Digital Songs chart peaking at number fifty.

In 2014, Marano voiced Rachel in four episodes of Randy Cunningham: 9th Grade Ninja. She also appeared as Hammu in Fish Hooks and as Fangs in Liv and Maddie. Also in 2014, she appeared in a music video produced for British pop-rock group The Vamps and American singer Demi Lovato called "Somebody to You". In March 2015, Marano stated that she had signed a record deal with Universal's Big Machine Records. In the same year, Marano starred in Disney Channel's Original Movie, Bad Hair Day. The film was first released on February 6, 2015, on Disney Channel and had its premiere broadcast in the US on February 13. She also starred as the young version of Amy in A Sort of Homecoming, which tells the story of a girl who returns to her home town in Louisiana from her career in New York City. On January 10, 2016, Austin and Ally ended after four seasons.

On January 13, 2016, Marano debuted her own radio talk show on Radio Disney entitled For the Record with Laura Marano. The weekly one-hour show chronicles Marano's journey as she launches her music career, featuring interviews with a guest star in each episode. The show also provides listeners tips on how one can pursue a career in music. The show has featured various guest stars including Nick Jonas, Ariana Grande, Meghan Trainor, OneRepublic, Troye Sivan and Zendaya. The first episode of the show, which aired January 12, 2016, guest starred her co-stars of Austin & Ally.

2016–present: Films and music 
On March 11, 2016, Marano released her debut single called "Boombox". The music video for the single released on April 4, 2016, and accumulated over 6 million views in a week. The video currently holds over 60 million views. It guest stars actor and comedian Ken Jeong, along with his daughter Zooey, and was directed by Cole Walliser. On April 30, 2016, Marano performed the single at the 2016 Radio Disney Music Awards, which aired on Disney Channel on May 1. Marano also performed the song on Today as Elvis Duran's Artist of the Month on May 31, 2016. Marano released her second single, "La La", on August 25, 2016. At the end of 2016, Big Machine Records made the decision to drop all of their pop artists, except for Taylor Swift. On May 18, 2017, it was announced that Marano had signed to Warner Bros. Records in 2017. In 2018, they parted ways, because the people who had signed her left Warner Bros.

On October 1, 2018, Marano announced in a Q&A video posted on her YouTube channel that she would be releasing new music as an independent artist. She named her own label Flip Phone Records, as Marano is known for still using a flip phone. On October 5, 2018, she released the single "Me" . In January 2019, she released the single "Let Me Cry" along with its music video. In February 2019, Marano performed at the Roxy Theatre in Los Angeles and released the single "F.E.O.U.". On March 8, 2019, she released her debut EP, Me, featuring two unheard tracks and a new remix to "F.E.O.U.".

On April 12, 2019, Marano released "A Little Closer", as part of the soundtrack of the Netflix original movie "The Perfect Date", which also sees Marano playing the role of Celia.
In June 2019, the Lie To Me music video came out, followed by the F.E.O.U. music video in October of the same year.
On November 22, 2019, Marano released both "Me and the Mistletoe" featuring Kurt Hugo Schneider, her first original Christmas single, and the soundtrack of "A Cinderella Story: Christmas Wish", which Marano stars in the movie.

On April 10, 2020, Marano released the single "When You Wake Up", followed by "Can't Hold On Forever" in May of the same year.
In June 2020, Marano released the remixes to these past two singles, respectively featuring Mark Diamond and PLTO.
In August 2020, the singer released a new single, titled "Honest With You", and during the same month, it was announced that her sophomore EP, titled You, would be coming out in fall of the same year, aiming for an October release. On September 18, 2020, the singer released a fourth single, "Can't Help Myself", along with the announcement of the release date of the EP, "YOU".
On September 21, the singer announced her first virtual tour, The YOU Tour, which would take place during the month of October, with four unique live-stream shows every week, from October 3 to 24, with each concert being unique and with a different formulation.
On January 22, 2021, the singer released the acoustic version of the single Something To Believe In, whereas the music video was released on February 19, 2021. 
On March 12, the remix of the single was ​​released in collaboration with DJ AFSHEEN. 
On April 16, the remix of the single, Honest With You, with the Malaysian singer Alextbh, was released. 
On May 21, the remix of Can't Help Myself was released, featuring Jean Deaux and produced by Poe Leos and on the same day, the deluxe version of the EP, YOU, was announced.

On September 24, 2021, the singer released the single I Wanna Know What It's Like. 
On December 31, 2021, the single Dance With You was released, featuring the electronic duo Grey, whereas on January 20, 2022, the single "Worst Kind of Hurt", with singer-songwriter Wrabel was released. Both songs are part of the soundtrack of the Netflix rom-com, The Royal Treatment, in which Marano also stars, released in January 2022. In February, a live performance of Worst Kind Of Hurt featuring Wrabel was released on Marano's YouTube channel, whereas the music video for Dance With You was released in March. Moreover, Marano and Michael Trewartha from Grey performed the song on The Kelly Clarkson Show during the same month.
In March 2022, the singer announced her first national concert tour, The Us Tour, set for summer 2022 and counting of 22 dates across the United States. On tour Marano performed several tracks on piano and with her band, which consisted of Mark Diamond on guitar and Ross Hodgkinson on drums.

Later that month, it was announced that Marano was to lead Netflix's interactive rom-com, Choose Love.

Philanthropy 
In August 2013, Marano was named the 2013 UNICEF's Trick-or-Treat for UNICEF Ambassador, which encouraged children to raise money on Halloween to help children around the world. About the campaign, Laura said "I'm so excited to celebrate Halloween this year by encouraging kids to support UNICEF's lifesaving work. The Trick-or-Treat for UNICEF campaign is a fun, easy way for kids to learn about world issues and to help other kids who are less fortunate." In August 2014, Marano was ambassador for the Disney and Birds Eye Vegetables campaign 'Step up to the plate'. The campaign's goal is to encourage children in the United States to explore healthy foods such as vegetables. In April 2019, Laura Marano hosted a fashion show for Childhelp during National Child Abuse Prevention Month. The campaign raised money to help abused and neglected children.

Filmography

Film

Television

Radio 
 For the Record with Laura Marano (2016), as Host, for Radio Disney

Discography

Soundtrack albums

EPs

Singles

As main artist

As featured artist

Promotional singles

Other charted songs

Other appearances

Music videos

Guest appearances

Concert tours

Headlining tours
 The Us Tour (2022)

Concerts
 Laura Marano at The Roxy (2019)
 The You Tour: A four-date live stream tour (2020)
 Sundays with Laura and You: A seven-date live stream concert series (2021)
 A Good Time with Laura Marano (2023)

Awards and nominations

References

External links 

1995 births
Living people
21st-century American actresses
American child actresses
American film actresses
American television actresses
American voice actresses
American people of Italian descent
Walt Disney Records artists
Big Machine Records artists
Warner Records artists